The Bataljon Bevrijding – 5 Linie is an infantry battalion in the Land Component of the Belgian Armed Forces. The regiment is a part of the Motorized Brigade and is Dutch-speaking. 

The regiment was formed in 1992 through the combination of the Bataljon Bevrijding (Liberation Battalion) and the 5e Liniebataljon (5th Line Infantry Battalion) in Leopoldsburg, both of which originated as regiments of the Belgian Army. Since then it has been deployed overseas on several occasions, most notably to Yugoslavia under the aegis of both NATO and the United Nations.

Battle honours

The Regiment Bevrijding – 5 Linie received the following battle honours:
Campaign 1914-1918
Antwerp
Lombardsijde
Yser/Oostrozebeke
Normandy
Wessem-Nederweert Canal

Organisation

The Bataljon Bevrijding – 5th of the Line comprises: 
HQ staff 
 1st company
 2nd company 
 3rd company
service company

Lineage

|-style="text-align: center; background: #F08080;"
| align="center" colspan="4"|Lineage
|-
| width="20%" colspan="3" align="center"|5th Regiment of the Line
| width="20%" rowspan="2" align="center" | Liberation Battalion – 5 Regiment of the Line
|-
| width="20%" colspan="1" align="center"|
| width="20%" align="center"| Brigade Piron
| width="20%" align="center"| Liberation Regiment

Sources

Liberation - 5th of the Line
Military units and formations established in 1992
1992 establishments in Belgium